Datuk Darell Leiking, also known as Ignatius Dorell Leiking (born 23 August 1971) is a Malaysian politician who has served as Member of the Sabah State Legislative Assembly (MLA) for Moyog since September 2020. He served as the Minister of International Trade and Industry in the Pakatan Harapan (PH) administration under former Prime Minister Mahathir Mohamad from July 2018 to the collapse of the PH administration in February 2020 and the Member of Parliament (MP) for Penampang from May 2013 to November 2022. He is a member of the Heritage Party (WARISAN) and was a member of the People's Justice Party (PKR), then a component party of the Pakatan Rakyat (PR) and PH coalitions. He has also served as the founding and 1st Deputy President of the WARISAN since October 2016.

Political career

State rights 
Leiking is one of many Sabah politicians who fight for the state rights as enshrined in the Malaysia Agreement, and he constantly urges the government to provide a definite solution to the problem of illegal immigrants in the state, especially the problems caused by Project IC with the huge influx of Filipino refugees, and to set to rest the North Borneo dispute once and for all. He has rejected controversial remarks made towards other minority groups by a prominent minister in the cabinet, which was echoed by Baru Bian of the People's Justice Party (PKR). He has also spoken out against discrimination towards other ethnic groups by certain politicians.

Elections

2013 general election 
In the 2013 election, Leiking with his party of PKR faced Bernard Giluk Dompok of United Pasokmomogun Kadazandusun Murut Organisation (UPKO) and subsequently won the parliamentary seat with a large majority.

2018 general election 
In the 2018 election, Leiking who had joined the then Sabah Heritage Party (WARISAN Sabah) after leaving PKR in 2016; defending his seat by defeating his cousin  Mandela Malakun of UPKO with another large majority.

Election results

Honours

Honours of Malaysia
  :
  Commander of the Order of Kinabalu (PGDK) – Datuk (2018)

Foreign honours
  :
  Gwanghwa Medal of the Order of Diplomatic Service Merit (2020)

References

External links 
 

1971 births
Living people
People from Sabah
Kadazan-Dusun people
People's Justice Party (Malaysia) politicians
Sabah Heritage Party politicians
Government ministers of Malaysia
Members of the Dewan Rakyat
Commanders of the Order of Kinabalu
21st-century Malaysian politicians